Edmondsham is a village in the county of Dorset in southern England. It is situated two miles north west of Verwood and ten miles north of Bournemouth. It is sited near the source of a small stream River Ed which flows into the River Crane, Dorset; both are SSSIs. In the 2001 Census it had a population of 200. The surrounding countryside is well-wooded. Edmondsham House was built in 1589 as marked on centre gable stone pillar, builders William Arnold and family - who later 1607-10 or 1609-13 finished off Cranborne Manor House, all three Arnolds having concentrated on Monteacute House 1590 - 1601; and in 1905 was described by Sir Frederick Treves as "grey with age" - in fact it is grey from the use of Marl "roman" Cement locally sourced from the glauconitic seam through the estate, and hence "like a mist in the wood". 

Edmondsham House Gardens and Park are Open to the Public - nominated days as "..by prior appointment.." (pre Finance Act 1998 amended rules). The wider Estate is public open access "..not limited to prior appointment.." (post FA 1998 rules), subject to Natural England guidelines (see their website open access conditions) - more details for both regimes in external links below.

Sir John Tregonwell Knt- Proctor to Catherine of Aragon in her divorce with Henry VIII, and Sponsor (one of three sponsors, draftsman) of both the Act of Succession 1534 and Act of Supremacy 1534 - had a granddaughter Elizabeth who married (23 April 1582) Roger Hussey builder of Edmondsham House. JT's son Thomas Tregonwell (decd 1563 2 years before his father) was bypassed, for Milton Abbey Dorset "Athelstan's centre of Britain" passed by the Statute of Uses 1535 to the grandson. Sir John Kellaway first married Joan Tregarthin - her second marriage to John Wadham d.1578 - Executor and overseer of John Tregonwell Knt Will. This John Wadham's offspring included Joan Wadham ma.Giles Strangways of Melbury Sampford, and Nichols Wadham II (1531/32 - 1609; Nicholas Wadham I his grandfather d.1542) who married Dorothy Petre-Wadham d. 1618 Foundress of Wadham College as designed by William Arnold. Sir William Petre Knt d.1572 greatest of friends with Sir John Tregonwell as well as overseer and Counsel to JT's Will "especial approved good friend" words in JT's Will, and father to Dorothy.

Henry Strangways daughter Anne married Sir John Kellaway of Rockbourne Hants, their daughter Elizabeth married (his AND her second marriages) Sir John Tregonwell Knt decd 1565....this the Tregonwell connection to Athlehampton - the reason for the Coat of Arms there. JT kept lodgings at Athlehampton House while writing law; for Elizabeth Kelway had firstly been married to Robert Martyn of Waterstone Manor moving to Athlehampton. Thomas Tregonwell d.1563 of Milton Abbey firstly married Anne Martyn (second marriage to Sir Oliver Wallop) sister to Nicholas Martyn of Waterstone who married secondly Margaret Wadham their daughter marrying John Young of Athlehampton House - the Arnolds of Somerset builders of features and the Gatehouse there.

The Tregonwell portraits are still at Edmondsham House, the original Holbein of Sir John Tregonwell lost in a fire at Cranborne Lodge in the 19th Century, later in his life knighted by Queen Mary "first true Queen of Britain" under the Act of Succession while JT still a Catholic. Sir John was great friends with Sir John Southcote Knt Lawyer and Sir Richard Rede Knt Lawyer.

Nicholas Wadham I's (d.1542) daughter Jane married a priest John Foster (possibly in secret) - this instrumental case going to Commission on which Sir John Tregonwell sat! This legal case setting legal precedent on Priest marriages, despite the calling in Clergy, marriages still law today for the Church of England - created by the same Statute Sir John co-wrote.

A rare shiny-leafed form of wych elm similar to 'Nitida' was found in the village in the early 20th century, a leaf specimen prepared for the Kew Herbarium by the Rev. Augustin Ley in 1910.

References

External links 

 Census data
 
 

Edmondsham